

This is a list of the Pennsylvania state historical markers in Cameron County.

This is intended to be a complete list of the official state historical markers placed in Cameron County, Pennsylvania by the Pennsylvania Historical and Museum Commission (PHMC). The locations of the historical markers, as well as the latitude and longitude coordinates as provided by the PHMC's database, are included below when available. There are 7 historical markers located in Cameron County.

Historical markers

See also

List of Pennsylvania state historical markers

References

External links
Pennsylvania Historical Marker Program
Pennsylvania Historical & Museum Commission

Pennsylvania state historical markers in Cameron County
Cameron County
Tourist attractions in Cameron County, Pennsylvania